The 2015 Porsche Carrera Cup Great Britain was a multi-event, one-make motor racing championship held across England, Belgium and Scotland. The championship featured a mix of professional motor racing teams and privately funded drivers, competing in Porsche 911 GT3 cars that conformed to the technical regulations for the championship. It formed part of the extensive program of support categories built up around the BTCC centrepiece. The 2015 season was the thirteenth Porsche Carrera Cup Great Britain season, commencing on 4 April at Brands Hatch – on the circuit's Indy configuration – and finished on 11 October at the same venue, utilising the Grand Prix circuit, after sixteen races at eight meetings. Fourteen of the races were held in support of the 2015 British Touring Car Championship season, with a round in support of the 2015 FIA World Endurance Championship.

With eleven victories and five second-place finishes from the sixteen races, Redline Racing driver Dan Cammish was the winner of the overall drivers' championship. Cammish, who at one point won 6 consecutive races, finished nearly 100 points clear of his next closest rival, team-mate Michael Meadows who was running under the Samsung SUHD TV Racing banner. Meadows took ten podium finishes, but only one victory, coming at Oulton Park. The championship top three was completed by defending champion Josh Webster (Team Parker Racing), who like Meadows, took one victory during the season, at Spa-Francorchamps. The only other drivers to win races were IDL Racing's Tom Sharp at Brands Hatch and GT Marques driver Dino Zamparelli, who swept the Silverstone weekend. In the Pro-Am classes, despite taking fewer class wins than Jordan Witt (Redline Racing), Juta Racing driver Ignas Gelžinis won the Pro-Am 1 title by five points. While in Pro-Am 2, six class wins were enough for John McCullagh to complete a championship sweep for Redline Racing.

Entry list

Race calendar and results
The calendar was announced by the championship organisers on 5 November 2014. The championship was reduced from 19 rounds in 2014 to 16 rounds, including two races at Circuit de Spa-Francorchamps in support of the FIA World Endurance Championship. It was the only round outside the United Kingdom; all other rounds were held in support of the 2015 British Touring Car Championship season.

Championship standings

Drivers' championships

Overall championship

Pro-Am championships

References

External links
 

Porsche Carrera Cup
Porsche Carrera Cup Great Britain seasons